Communauté d'agglomération de Bastia is the communauté d'agglomération, an intercommunal structure, centred on the city of Bastia. It is located in the Haute-Corse department, in the Corsica region, southeastern France. Created in 2001, its seat is in Bastia. Its area is 68.1 km2. Its population was 62,240 in 2019, of which 48,503 in Bastia proper.

Composition
The communauté d'agglomération consists of the following 5 communes:
Bastia
Furiani
San-Martino-di-Lota
Santa-Maria-di-Lota
Ville-di-Pietrabugno

References

Bastia
Bastia